Ichihara (written: 市原) is a Japanese surname. Notable people with the surname include:

, Japanese actress
, Japanese actor
, Japanese footballer
, Japanese golfer
, Japanese sprinter
, Japanese footballer
, Japanese football and manager
Takayuki Ichihara, Japanese sumo wrestler
, Japanese opera singer
, Japanese golfer

Fictional characters
, a character in the manga series xxxHolic

Japanese-language surnames